Teniente César López Rojas District (Spanish teniente lieutenant) is one of six districts of the province Alto Amazonas in Peru. The district was established on 8 September 1964.

References

Districts of the Alto Amazonas Province
Districts of the Loreto Region
1964 establishments in Peru